Heidenstam or von Heidenstam is a surname. Notable people with the surname include:

 Gustaf von Heidenstam (1822–1887), Swedish engineer
 Verner von Heidenstam (1859–1940), Swedish poet and novelist
 Hugo von Heidenstam (1884–1966), Swedish diplomat and engineer
 Oscar Heidenstam (1911–1991), Cyprus-born British bodybuilder

Swedish-language surnames